The Hingol mud volcanoes are located in Lasbela District, Balochistan, Pakistan at a distance of around 100 km from Uthal, which is the headquarter of District Lasbela. The mud volcanoes are located in Hingol National Park which is the largest national park in Pakistan. It contains about ten clusters of mud volcanoes, the most important of which are Chandragup and Khandewari volcanoes.

These are not located on the main road about a kilometer off the Makran Coastal Highway leading from Lasbela to Gwadar; the locals may provide guidance to the exact location. A landmark is a SSGC installation. The site is a complex of three major mud volcanoes and a number of smaller ones.

The three mud volcanoes of the location are named as Chandragup1, Chandragup2 and Chandragup3. One of which is a 300-foot-high mud volcano. It is a sacred annual pilgrimage site for Hindus, along with the closeby Hinglaj Mata mandir. Also known as Chandrakup, the volcano is considered holy by Hindus and is an important stop for pilgrims on their way to the Hinglaj Mata temple. Devotees throw coconuts into the craters to make wishes and thank the gods for answering their prayers.

Chandragup
Chandragup is an active mud volcano located in Hingol National Park in Balochistan, Pakistan. Also known as Chandrakup, the volcano is considered holy by Hindus and is an important stop for pilgrims on their way to the shrine of Shri Hinglaj Mata temple.

The Chandragup mud volcano is worshipped as an embodiment 
of the Hindu god Shiva, and called Baba Chandragup. Pilgrims to the volcano believe that the Shri Hinglaj Mata temple may only be entered only after paying homage to Baba Chandrakup. Traditionally, the pilgrim stays awake all night, fasting and meditating on the sins they will confess at the rim the following day. They bake roti made out of ingredients contributed by all the yātrīs. On the next day they ascend the slope of Chandrakup, and the roṭi is served as an offering to Baba Chandrakup. Nowadays, coconuts, betel nut and dal are also offered. At the volcano's peak, the pilgrims must introduce themselves with their full name and place of origin and then call out their sins in front of the group. According to the bubbling of the mud and the reaction of the wind, the chaṛīdār is able to tell if the pilgrim's sins are forgiven.

Devotees throw coconuts into the craters to make wishes and thank the gods for answering their prayers.

Gallery

See also
List of volcanoes in Pakistan
Shri Hinglaj Mata temple
Hinduism in Balochistan

References

Volcanoes of Pakistan
Mud volcanoes
Landforms of Balochistan (Pakistan)
Natural history of Balochistan, Pakistan
Protected areas of Balochistan, Pakistan
Hinduism in Balochistan, Pakistan